The following is a list of the Dead Sea Scrolls from the cave 2 near  Qumran.

Description
Wadi Qumran Cave 2 was discovered in February 1952 and soon the Bedouin people discovered 30 fragments in it. The cave eventually yielded 300 fragments from 33 manuscripts of Dead Sea Scrolls, including fragments of Jubilees and the Wisdom of Sirach written in Hebrew.

List of manuscripts
Some resources for more complete information on the Dead Sea Scrolls are the book by Emanuel Tov, "Revised Lists of the Texts from the Judaean Desert" for a complete list of all of the Dead Sea Scroll texts, as well as the online webpages for the Shrine of the Book and the Leon Levy Collection, both of which present photographs and images of the scrolls and fragments themselves for closer study. Information is not always comprehensive, as content for many scrolls has not yet been fully published.
{|class="wikitable"
|-
! Fragment or Scroll Identifier
! Fragment or Scroll Name
! Alternative Identifier
! English Bible Association
! Language
! Date/Script
! Description
! Reference
|-
! colspan="8" style="background:#b8c7d6;"|
Qumran Cave 2
|-
|2QGen ||Genesis
|2Q1|| Genesis 19:27–28; 36:6, 35–37
|rowspan=5| Hebrew
|rowspan=3| Herodian
|
|
|-
|2QExoda
|rowspan=3|Exodus
|2Q2|| Exodus 1:11–14; 7:1–4; 9:27–29; 11:3–7; 12:32–41; 21:18–20(?); 26:11–13; 30:21(?), 23–25; 32:32–34
|
|
|-
|2QExodb
|2Q3|| Exodus 4:31; 12:26–27(?); 18:21–22; 21:37–22:2, 15–19; 27:17–19; 31:16–17; 19:9; 34:10
|
|
|-
|2QExodc
|2Q4|| Exodus 5:3–5
|Hellenistic-Roman
|
|
|-
|2QpaleoLev ||Leviticus
|2Q5|| Leviticus 11:22-29
| Hasmonean; Palaeo-Hebrew script
|
|
|-
|2QNuma
|rowspan=4| Numbers
|2Q6|| Numbers 3:38–41, 51– 4:3
|rowspan=4| Hebrew
|rowspan=3| Herodian
|
|
|-
|2QNumb
|2Q7|| Numbers 33:47–53
|
|
|-
|2QNumc
|2Q8|| Numbers 7:88
|
|
|-
|2QNumd?
|2Q9|| Numbers 18:8–9
|Hellenistic-Roman
|This fragment may belong to 2Q7; possibly = Leviticus 23:1–3
|
|-
|2QDeuta
|rowspan=3|Deuteronomy
|2Q10
|Deuteronomy 1:7–9 ||Hebrew
|50–25 BCE
Late Hasmonean or Early Herodian
|
|
|-
| 2QDeutb
|2Q11|| Deuteronomy 17:12–15 ||Hebrew
|30 BCE – 68 CE
Herodian
|
|
|-
|2QDeutc
|2Q12|| Deuteronomy 10:8–12 ||Hebrew
|1–68 CE
Late Herodian
|
|
|-
|2QJer ||Jeremiah
|2Q13|| Jeremiah 42:7–11, 14; 43:8–11; 44:1–3, 12–14; 46:27–47:7; 48:7, 25–39, 43–45; 49:10
|rowspan=3|Hebrew
|rowspan=3|Herodian
|Doubtfully identified fragments: 13:22; 32:24–25; 48:2–4, 41–42
|
|-
|2QPs || Psalms
|2Q14|| Psalm 103:2–11; 104:6–11
|
|
|-
|2QJob ||Job
|2Q15|| Job 33:28–30
|
|
|-
| 2QRutha
|rowspan=2|Ruth
|2Q16|| Ruth 2:13–23; 3:1–8; 4:3–4
|rowspan=2| Hebrew
|Herodian
|
|
|-
|2QRuthb
|2Q17|| Ruth 3:13–18
|Hasmonean
|
|
|-
|2QSir || "Wisdom of Sirach" or "Ecclesiasticus"
|2Q18
|Sir 6:14–15 (or 1:19–20); 6:20–31
|Hebrew
|Herodian
|Ben Sira
|
|-
|2QJuba || Book of Jubilees
|2Q19|| Genesis 25:7–9
|rowspan=2|Hebrew
|rowspan=2 |Herodian
|Jub 23:7–8
|
|-
|2QJubb || Book of Jubilees
|2Q20|| Exodus 1:7; Genesis 50:26, 22 (different order)
|Jub 46:1–3 
|
|-
|2QapMoses /2QapocrMoses(?)|| "Apocryphon of Moses"
|2Q21||
|Hebrew
|Herodian
|Apocryphal writing about Moses
|
|-
|2QapDavid /2QapocrDavid|| "Apocryphon of David"
|2Q22|| ||Hebrew
|Herodian
|Apocryphal writing about David
|
|-
|2QapProph /2Qapocr.Prophecy || "Apocryphal Prophecy"
|2Q23|| ||Hebrew
|Herodian
|Apocryphal prophetic text in six tiny fragments.
|
|-
| 2QNJ || "New Jerusalem"
|2Q24
|| || Aramaic 
|Herodian
|Description of the New Jerusalem. cf. 1Q32 ar, 11Q18 ar
|
|-
| 2Q Juridical Text || "Juridical Text"
|2Q25|| ||Hebrew
|Herodian
|A juridical text
|
|-
|2QEnGiants || "Book of Giants" from "Enoch"
|2Q26
|
|Aramaic 
|Herodian
|Now known as part of the "Book of Giants". cf. 6Q8 ||
|-
| 2Q27
2Q28 2Q29

2Q30 2Q31

2Q32 2Q33
||
|2Q27
2Q28 2Q29

2Q30 2Q31

2Q32 2Q33
||  ||
||| Unidentified Texts
|
|-
|2QX1
|
|2QX1 || || ||
|Debris in a box
|
|}

See also 
 Biblical manuscripts
 Septuagint manuscripts
 List of Hebrew Bible manuscripts

References

Bibliography

External links
 A Catalog of Biblical Passages in the Dead Sea Scrolls by David Washburn, 2002
 Textual Criticism: Recovering the Text of the Hebrew Bible by Peter Kyle McCarter, 1986

Dead Sea Scrolls
Qumran Cave 2